Merrily We Roll Along may refer to:

 Merrily We Roll Along (play), a 1934 play by George S. Kaufman and Moss Hart
 Merrily We Roll Along (musical), a 1981 musical by Stephen Sondheim and George Furth, adapted from the 1934 play
 "Merrily We Roll Along" (song) a Warner Bros. theme song
 Merrily We Roll Along (film), an upcoming American coming-of-age musical comedy film based on the 1981 musical
 "Goodnight, Ladies", an old folk song which contains the line "Merrily we roll along"